The Barrett Model 98B (also known as the Barrett Model 98 Bravo) is a bolt-action sniper rifle chambered in .338 Lapua Magnum (8.6×70mm or 8.58×70mm) and manufactured by Barrett Firearms Manufacturing. The Model 98B was officially announced in October 2008, and became available for sale in early 2009, with an MSRP of $4,495.00.

Overview
Barrett engineers began designing the Model 98B in 1997, with a goal of developing a precision tactical .338 Lapua rifle not based on any sporting rifles. The initial semi-auto design, the Model 98 was unveiled at the 1998 SHOT Show, but never went into full production. In past years, Ronnie Barrett's son, Chris, revived the company's interest in the .338 rifle.

Many of the Model 98B's features are inspired by Stoner's AR-15/M16; the hinged aluminum upper and lower receivers, ergonomic pistol grip and thumb operated safety are all borrowed from Stoner's design. The upper receiver also features a full length 1913 style Picatinny rail for mounting optics, lasers, etc., and two additional accessory rails are mounted forward of the main rail on each side of the upper.

The Model 98B also features a fluted medium-heavy  barrel made of 4150 MIL-B-11595 steel. The barrel is rifled in a six groove, 1:10" right hand twist pattern, and features a two-port muzzle brake threaded on and indexed by a jam nut. The bolt rides in a new "bolt guide" design, consisting of two tubular glass-filled polymer guides which have been infused with Teflon. These guides allow the bolt to travel better, as well as reducing the need for lubrication, and helping to seal the ejection and bolt handle ports from dirt. The bolt head is made of case-hardened 8620 steel, features nine lugs (three sets of three), and is attached to the bolt body with a crosspin. This separate bolt head design allows for simple caliber changes, as well as future pre-headspaced barrel and bolt-head sets.

The lower receiver is forged from 7075 aluminum, can mount any type of AR-15/M-16 pistol grip, and features an ambidextrous magazine latch just forward of the integral trigger guard. Also featured within the lower receiver is the rifle's trigger assembly. The trigger assembly can be removed from the receiver as a single unit, and features adjustment screws for weight (2 to 4 lbs.) and overtravel, as well as a reversible AR-15/M-16 style thumb safety.

The rifle also comes from the factory with a Harris brand S-BR bipod attached to the fore-end.

The Model 98B was featured both on the cover, and in an article, of the April 2009 issue of American Rifleman magazine.

MRAD

Barrett's offering for USSOCOM Precision Sniper Rifle Contract, the MRAD is derived from the Model 98B; changes include cutting back the fixed stock and integrating a folding adjustable stock, a Desert Tan finish color, a front loading quick change barrel for caliber change although at this point the only offered barrel and caliber is a 24.5-inch fluted barrel with a 1 turn in 10 right hand twist chambered for .338 Lapua Magnum.

Safety recall
On September 9, 2009, Barrett released a recall notice regarding the Model 98B. They determined that if the rifle is dropped or subjected to a significant impact, it could accidentally discharge. A modification to the lower receiver is required to ensure user safety.

See also

 Accuracy International AWM
 C14 Timberwolf
 Sako TRG

References

External links
 Barrett Model 98B operator's manual
 Poole, Eric, Barrett Model 98B .338 Lapua mag, Special Weapons for Military & Police
 Video Statistics and Shooting of the Model 98B from AmericanRifleman.org

2008 introductions
Weapons and ammunition introduced in 2008
Barrett firearms
Bolt-action rifles of the United States
Sniper rifles of the United States
Military equipment introduced in the 2000s
.338 Lapua Magnum rifles